Igor Bodrov (born 9 July 1987) is a Ukrainian sprinter.

Career
Bodrov began his sport career with the 34th International Children's Games held in Plock, Poland in 2002. When he took the gold medal in the 100 m, his result was 11.61. He finished fourth in the 200 m at the 2006 World Junior Championships setting his personal best at 21.17 seconds. He also competed at the 2008 World Indoor Championships and the 2008 Olympic Games without reaching the final.

At the 2009 European Athletics U23 Championships he placed third over 200 m, improving his personal record to 20.61. At the 2010 European Team Championships he finished fourth at 20.77.

He won a gold medal in the 4×100m relay at the 2013 Summer Universiade, where he also placed fifth in the individual 100 m with a time of 10.29 seconds.

Personal life 
Bodrov is trained by his parents Valery Bodrov and Nadya Bodrova, both being former international runners. Nadya competed in two Olympics, coached by her husband. Hence Bodrov literally grew up on the stadium and can not recall when he started training. He graduated in coaching from the Kharkiv State Academy of Physical Culture and in law from the Sumy State University.

Statistics

References

External links 

 
 Profile Igor Bodrov from www.all-athletics.com
 Profile Igor Bodrov from www.trackandfield.ru
 Igor Bodrov from kharkov-la.ru

1987 births
Living people
Sportspeople from Kharkiv
Ukrainian male sprinters
Athletes (track and field) at the 2008 Summer Olympics
Athletes (track and field) at the 2016 Summer Olympics
Olympic athletes of Ukraine
Universiade medalists in athletics (track and field)
Universiade gold medalists for Ukraine
Medalists at the 2013 Summer Universiade
Kharkiv State College of Physical Culture 1 alumni
Sumy State University alumni